Frederick Hasselborough (drowned 4 November 1810, in Perseverance Harbour), whose surname is also spelled Hasselburgh and Hasselburg, was an Australian sealer from Sydney who discovered Campbell (4 January 1810) and Macquarie Islands (11 July 1810).

References

Year of birth missing
1810 deaths
Sealers
People from Sydney
History of the New Zealand outlying islands
Campbell Island, New Zealand
Macquarie Island